is a railway station in the city of Tochigi, Tochigi, Japan, operated by the private railway operator Tobu Railway. The station is numbered "TN-32".

Lines

Station layout
The station consists of two opposed side platforms connected to the station building by a footbridge.

Platforms

Adjacent stations

History
Yashū-Ōtsuka Station opened on 1 November 1931. From 17 March 2012, station numbering was introduced on all Tobu lines, with Yashū-Ōtsuka Station becoming "TN-32".

Passenger statistics
In fiscal 2019, the station was used by an average of 513 passengers daily (boarding passengers only).

Surrounding area
Former Kou village hall
Kou Post Office

See also
 List of railway stations in Japan

References

External links

  

Railway stations in Tochigi Prefecture
Stations of Tobu Railway
Railway stations in Japan opened in 1931
Tobu Utsunomiya Line
Tochigi, Tochigi